The 2020–21 season is Göztepe S.K.'s 96th season in existence and the club's fourth consecutive season in the top flight of Turkish football. In addition to the domestic league, Göztepe will participate in this season's edition of the Turkish Cup. The season covers the period from July 2020 to 30 June 2021.

Players

Current squad

Transfers

In

Out

Pre-season and friendlies

Competitions

Overview

Süper Lig

League table

Results summary

Results by round

Matches

Turkish Cup

Statistics

Goalscorers

References

External links

Göztepe S.K. seasons
Göztepe S.K.